Christopher Mark Fisher  (born 8 October 1960) is a British civil and public servant. He was Director General and Secretary to the Grenfell Tower Inquiry from 2017 to 2021. He was previously Director of the Office for Civil Society at the Cabinet Office and was a Board Director of Jobcentre Plus.

In March 2022, he was appointed chief executive of the Greater Manchester integrated care system. He has not previously worked in the NHS.

Fisher was appointed Commander of the Order of the British Empire (CBE) in the 2010 New Year Honours.

References

Administrators in the National Health Service
21st-century British civil servants
Living people
1960 births
Civil servants in the Department of Health and Social Security
Civil servants in the Department of Social Security
Civil servants in the Department for Work and Pensions
20th-century British civil servants
Civil servants in the Cabinet Office
Commanders of the Order of the British Empire